Nathaniyal Murmu Memorial College is a college at Tapan  in the Dakshin Dinajpur district of West Bengal, India. The college is affiliated to University of Gour Banga. This college offers undergraduate courses in arts.

Departments

Bengali
English
History
Education
Sociology

See also

References

External links
Nathaniyal Murmu Memorial College
University of Gour Banga
University Grants Commission
National Assessment and Accreditation Council

Colleges affiliated to University of Gour Banga
Educational institutions established in 2011
Universities and colleges in Dakshin Dinajpur district
2011 establishments in West Bengal